Sharleen Eugene Spiteri (born 7 November 1967) is a Scottish singer and guitarist, best known as the lead singer of the rock band Texas. She has a contralto vocal range. In 2013, Texas's worldwide album sales were counted at 40 million records.

Texas returned from their hiatus in 2013 with The Conversation, which debuted at No. 4 on the UK Album Chart, No. 3 on their native Scottish Album Charts as well as No. 8 in France. A 25th-anniversary album followed in 2015 entitled Texas 25, followed by the band's ninth studio album, Jump on Board (2017), which achieved mainstream chart success, topping the albums charts in Scotland and debuting within the top ten in France, the United Kingdom and Belgium. Their tenth studio album, Hi was released in May 2021 and became their highest charting album in the UK since 1999's The Hush, reaching number three on the official UK Albums Chart, number one on the UK Independent Albums Charts and debuting at number one in their native Scotland.

During the period Texas were on hiatus during 2005–2013, Spiteri released her debut solo album Melody which was released in 2008, followed by a second solo album, The Movie Songbook, in March 2010. During this time, Spiteri was a judge on the Sky music talent show, Must Be the Music.

Early life 
Spiteri was born in Bellshill Maternity Hospital in Bellshill, Scotland, to father Eddie, a guitar-playing merchant seaman, and mother Vilma, a singing window-dresser. Spiteri is of Maltese, Italian, Irish and German descent. When she was young, the family moved from the Glaswegian suburbs to nearby Balloch, close to the shores of Loch Lomond, and she went to Vale of Leven Academy school there.

As a teenager, she was interested by pop culture. Music was her escape: "I used to love going to the record shop on a Saturday and I'd buy a single and a plastic sleeve. I'd go back to my bedroom where [singer] Siouxsie Sioux was painted on my bedroom wall". She later stated: "I guess what people never realise is that real bands and musicians are geeks, we spend our youth as geeks and we turn into these rock stars."

While a student at Vale of Leven Academy, her nickname was 'Spit the Dog', after the character on the TV show Tiswas.

Career 

Sharleen Spiteri worked as a hairdresser in Muirhead, North Lanarkshire, until Texas became her sole priority in 1988.

Southside and early success (1989–1997) 

Spiteri's musical influences include the Clash (the main reason she plays a black Fender Telecaster), Blondie, Marvin Gaye and Prince. She is also a dedicated Diana Ross fan. Spiteri co-founded the band while working at the Irvine Rusk salon as a hairdresser in Glasgow. The band, composed of Spiteri, Johnny McElhone, Ally McErlaine, Tony McGovern, Eddie Campbell, Michael Bannister and Neil Payne, first released an EP titled Everyday Now before releasing their debut album Southside in July 1989. The band gained international success with their debut single "I Don't Want a Lover" which reached No. 8 in the UK Singles Chart, and No. 77 on the US Billboard Hot 100 charts. Later singles released from Southside were not as successful, "Thrill Has Gone" which charted at No. 60 on the UK Singles Chart, "Everyday Now" at No. 44 and "Prayer For You" at No. 73. Only four singles were released from Southside before going on a tour and return to the studio to start work on their second album Mothers Heaven.

Around the same time as Southside was being recorded, Spiteri's cousin Mark Rankin was founding his own band, the hard rock band Gun, and Spiteri contributed backing vocals to two tracks from their debut album Taking on the World, also released in 1989.

In 1991, Texas's second studio album Mothers Heaven was released, soon after the band released an extended play to help promote the album; Extracts from Mothers Heaven was released in 1991. The album was released on 23 September 1991 and was not as successful as Southside. The album charted at a low and unexpected No. 32 on the UK Album Charts and two singles "Why Believe in You" which charted at No. 66 in the UK, "In My Heart" which charted at No. 74 in the United Kingdom were not as successful. However, the album's third and final single "Alone With You" was more successful, reaching No. 32 on the UK Singles Chart. Promotion had stopped for Mothers Heaven and again the band returned to the studio to work on their third album, Ricks Road.

Ricks Road was released in 1993, again, not as successful as the band and fans had hoped for, but chart and sales wise, the album did better than Mothers Heaven. Ricks Road charted at No. 18 on the UK Album Charts, only spending a further 1-week falling to No. 56 on the UK Album Charts before leaving the charts. The album's lead single "So Called Friend" charted at No. 30 on the UK Singles Chart and the second "You Owe It All To Me" charted at No. 39. The further three singles released, "So in Love With You" charted at No. 28 in the United Kingdom. The further two singles "You've Got To Give a Little" and "Fade Away" did not chart in the United Kingdom.

White on Blonde and rise to popularity (1997–2000) 
In 1997, Texas came back to the music scene with the international hit "Say What You Want". The song was released internationally on 6 January 1997. The song became the band's highest-charting single to date on the UK Singles Chart, peaking at No. 3. In February, Texas released their fourth, multi-platinum selling album. White on Blonde, it went on to become the band's most successful album to date. The album charted at No. 1 on the UK Album Charts and returned to the top spot in the United Kingdom three times (including its debut peak at number one). The album managed 91 weeks on the UK Album Charts.

After the success of "Say What You Want", Texas released the track "Halo" on 7 April 1997. "Halo" became one of the band's biggest charting UK singles (the band's third UK Top 10 single at that point) charting at No. 10 on the UK Singles Chart. Like "Say What You Want", "Halo" received strong airplay on British radio stations and received fairly positive reviews from music critics. The song stayed on the UK Singles Charts for a total of seven weeks. Texas went on to release a third single from the album; "Black Eyed Boy" was released on 28 July 1997 and became the band's fourth UK top-ten single at the time of its release. The song charted at No. 5 on the UK Singles Chart and No. 29 on the French Singles Charts, as well as charting at No. 68 in Germany and No. 23 on the Irish Singles Charts. In the United Kingdom, the song received strong radio play. The song managed 6 weeks on the UK Singles Chart.

The album's fourth single; "Put Your Arms Around Me" was released on 3 November 1997. The single became the band's fifth United Kingdom top-ten single at the time when it was released in November 1997 and also made White on Blonde one of a few albums to spawn five UK top-ten Singles. The song managed a strong eight weeks on the UK Singles Chart. In 1998, Texas's song "Put Your Arms Around Me" was the lone vocal track for the Andy Tennant film, Ever After: A Cinderella Story, starring Drew Barrymore. In 1999, Texas released their first single from their new fifth studio album. "In Our Lifetime" was released in April 1999 and became the band's second highest charting single in the United Kingdom, debuting at No. 4 on the UK Singles Chart. The song also was included on the Notting Hill soundtrack. With the success of "In Our Lifetime", Texas continued to go ahead with the released of their fifth studio album; The Hush was released in May 1999, and like its predecessor White on Blonde, charted at No. 1 on the UK Album Charts in its first week of release. The Hush received fair reviews with 'All Music Guide' stating the album was "Blessed with a stylish production and sharp commercial songs". In the album's second week, it dropped two places to No. 3 but in its third week rose back to No. 2. The album managed 43 weeks on the UK Album Charts.

With the continued Texas success, the band followed up the success of their album with a second single. "Summer Son" was released on 16 August 1999. Summer Son charted in the UK top 10 at No. 5, making Summer Son the band's seventh UK top-ten single at that point. "Summer Son" received a lot of fair radio airplay in the United Kingdom and other parts of Europe and received a fair amount of positive reviews. The song serves as one of Texas's biggest and best known songs to date. One more single was released from The Hush, "When We Are Together". The song was released on 15 November 1999 and missed the UK top 10, but became the band's 13th UK top-40 singles (including their UK top-ten singles). The song charted at No. 12 on the UK Singles Chart behind Garbage's 1999 James Bond film theme "The World Is Not Enough". The Hush has become one of the band's biggest selling albums worldwide.

The Greatest Hits (2000–2005) 

In 2000, Texas released their debut Greatest Hits album on 23 October 2000. The album's lead single "In Demand" was released 2 October 2000. The song reached No. 6 on the UK Singles Chart and also reached high positions in various European countries such as No. 80 in Germany, No. 10 in Spain, No. 20 on the Irish Singles Charts and No. 49 in Switzerland.

When The Greatest Hits was released, it went straight to No. 1 in the United Kingdom like the previous to studio albums White on Blonde and The Hush. The album also charted at No. 24 on the Belgium Album top 100, No. 48 on the Spanish Albums Top 100 charts, No. 60 on the Irish Album Charts and No. 72 in Switzerland. The Greatest Hits saw the release of a second single titled "Inner Smile". The song was released at the end of 2000 and the beginning of 2001 in certain countries. Inner Smile reached No. 6 on the UK Singles Chart, becoming the band's ninth UK top-ten single at the time of the single's release. The video for "Inner Smile" featured a homage to Elvis Presley (and specifically his '68 Comeback Special shows) with Spiteri dressed as Presley in his black leather suit and using prosthetics to resemble him. It had some black and white stills showing her in distinct situations (in one of them, Sharleen/Elvis proudly holds a belt with the word "SHAR" instead of "ELVIS", formed with diamonds). The video clip was shot in London in November 2000 with a live audience and with the band members playing different roles as musicians and/or audience members (with Spiteri portraying various groupies).

In September 2002, Spiteri gave birth to her daughter Mysty Kyd, although this did not prevent her from working on another album. On 6 October 2003, Texas released their first single from their upcoming sixth album titled Carnival Girl, which featured rapping vocals by Canadian artist Kardinal Offishall. The song reached No. 9 on the UK Singles Chart, No. 15 on the Denmark Singles Charts, No. 41 in Switzerland, No. 43 on the Irish Singles Charts, No. 57 on the French Singles Charts top 100, and No. 94 on the German top 100. On 30 October 2003, Texas released their long-awaited sixth studio album, Careful What You Wish For. The album did not make No. 1 in the United Kingdom like the past three albums (two studio releases and one Greatest Hits) but however, made No. 5 on the UK Album Charts and only managed Gold status awarded by the BPI for sales of over 100,000 copies in the United Kingdom. A second and final single, "I'll See It Through", was released on 8 December 2003. The single became the band's lowest charting single in the UK since "In My Heart" in 1991. The song only managed to make it to No. 40 on the UK Singles Chart and remained in the UK Top 100 for another two weeks.

Red Book and hiatus (2005–2008) 
The band returned in mid-2005 with the single "Getaway", which entered the UK Singles Chart at No. 6, becoming the band's tenth UK top-ten single. The song also charted at No. 6 on the Denmark Singles Top 40, No. 18 in Norway, No. 34 on the Irish Singles Charts, No. 41 in Sweden, No. 43 in Belgium No. 45 in Switzerland, No. 59 in France, and 59 in Germany. "Can't Resist" was released as the second single on 31 October 2005. The song failed to make the UK Top 10, reaching No. 13 and becoming the band's nineteenth UK Top-40 single. The band's seventh studio album, Red Book, followed on 7 November 2005. The album reached No. 16 in the UK albums chart. Red Book became the band's third album to miss the UK Top 10 after Mothers Heaven in 1991 and Ricks Road in 1993. The band's third and final single "Sleep" from the album was released on 9 January 2006. The song was the band's eleventh UK Top 10 single, peaking at No. 6 on the UK Singles Chart as well as making No. 37 on the Irish Singles Charts. The song featured vocals from Paul Buchannan from the Scottish band, the Blue Nile. On 21 February 2006, a promo-only single, "What About Us", was released. On 24 September 2007 the band released The BBC Sessions, including radio sessions spanning from 1989 to 2005, with extensive liner notes and interviews with Spiteri. Cover songs include Elmore James's "It Hurts Me Too", the Beatles' "I've Got a Feeling", and Ashford & Simpson's "You're All I Need to Get By."

In 2008, Spiteri embarked on a solo career. Her debut album Melody was released in July 2008 and debuted at No. 3 in the UK. Worldwide the album sold over 300,000 copies. She released her debut solo single, "All The Times I Cried", which made the UK Top 40 at No. 26. She also released the singles, "Stop, I Don't Love You Anymore" and "It Was You". "Don't Keep Me Waiting" was released as a promo single in Switzerland. On New Year's Eve 2009, she performed two cover songs on The Graham Norton Show. Her second solo studio album, The Movie Songbook, was released on 1 March 2010 worldwide. On 11 September 2009, Ally McErlaine was hospitalised after he collapsed with a massive brain aneurysm at age 41. As of February 2010, he is on the road to recovery, as reported by Spiteri in The Sunday Mail: "Ally is the most stubborn person I have ever come across, and I think his sheer pigheadedness is the reason he's still here. When he asked what was happening with Texas, I said it was up to him. He told me he wanted to get back into the studio."

Solo career and Melody (2008–2013) 

After the release of Texas's 2005 album Red Book the band members confirmed that they would enter a hiatus. Spiteri performed as guest vocalist on Rammstein's Rosenrot album. She began work on her debut solo album, working with some of her former bandmates. She wrote the vast majority of the tracks on the album. She released her debut solo album Melody on 14 July 2008 with "All The Times I Cried" serving as the album's lead single. The song charted at No. 26 on the UK Singles Chart. Melody was proven popular in the United Kingdom, debuting at a high No. 3 on the UK Album Charts. In other European countries where Texas were popular like in Belgium, the album charted at No. 15 on the Belgium Flanders Charts and No. 13 on the Belgium Wallonia Charts. The song "Don't Keep Me Waiting" was released as a single in Switzerland only, in which it charted at No. 78 on the singles charts there. A further two singles were released worldwide, "Stop, I Don't Love You Anymore" and "It Was You" which were both unpopular in the United Kingdom, missing the UK top 100, with "Stop, I Don't Love You Anymore" charting at No. 107 and "It Was You" at No. 178. By 2009, Melody has been certified Gold by the BPI (UK) with sales of over 100,000.

Spiteri released her second solo studio album The Movie Songbook which consists of film covers chosen by Spiteri herself was released on 1 March 2010. The album's lead single "Xanadu" was released in February 2010, and charted at No. 71 on the UK Singles Chart in March 2010. As for the album, it charted at No. 13 on the UK Album Charts on 7 March 2010, thus becoming Spiteri's second UK top-40 album as a soloist, and her seventh UK top-40 album both as a soloist and a member of Texas. To promote the album, she performed in front of 55,000 fans supporting Paul McCartney on his Up and Coming Tour at Hampden Park in Glasgow.

In 2010, Spiteri appeared as a judge on the Sky 1 reality show Must Be the Music. Spiteri has a large lesbian fanbase, although she is heterosexual.

Return to Texas and The Conversation (2013–2015) 
In February 2013, Music Week announced the band had signed a new record deal with PIAS Recordings and were to release their first new album since reuniting. The Conversation was released on 20 May 2013. Physical formats included a single disc and double-disc deluxe edition. The latter featured a bonus disc entitled Live in Scotland. Also in 2013, a UK tour was announced and the album launched at two gigs, one at King Tut's Wah Wah Hut in Glasgow and the other at the 100 Club in London. Spiteri performed a cover of "River Deep – Mountain High" at these gigs as well as a selection of new tracks from The Conversation. Tracks are written mainly by Spiteri herself and Johnny McElhone, with Richard Hawley and Bernard Butler as collaborators. The album's lead single of the same name joined BBC Radio 2's playlist in April 2013 with two more singles, "Detroit City" and "Dry Your Eyes", following later that year. The album is certified Platinum in France and peaked at No. 4 on the UK Album Charts.

In November 2014, Texas contributed to BBC Radio 2's Sounds of the '80s album with a cover of "Don't Talk to Me About Love" by Altered Images, a band which also included current Texas member Johnny McElhone in its lineup.

Texas 25, Jump on Board and Hi (2015–present) 

To celebrate the band's 25th anniversary, it was announced that some of their biggest hits would be re-recorded for a new album entitled Texas 25. The collection features eight songs from the band's back catalogue completely reworked with the help of New York production team Truth & Soul, as well as four brand new songs, and was released on 16 February 2015. Deluxe packages include a second disc of the hits in their original form. The lead single, "Start a Family", premiered online on 6 January 2015. The band embarked on a UK tour throughout April and May 2015.

The band released their ninth studio album, Jump on Board in May 2017 to critical acclaim, with "Let's Work it Out" serving as the lead single from the new album. Jump on Board performed well commercially in the band's native Scotland, debuting at number one on the Scottish Albums Chart. The album reached number one in France and performed well in the UK chart. In support of the album, the band embarked on the Jump on Board Live Tour world tour.

On 28 February 2020, the band announced on Twitter that its next album was called Hi, which was released on BMG on 28 May 2021. A single, also called "Hi", was released in December 2020 and reunited the band with the Wu-Tang Clan after 22 years. A video was released for the song with Small Axe actor Kadeem Ramsay, a promo video that also includes footage of Texas, RZA and Method Man performing "Say What You Want" at the BRIT Awards in 1998.

In April 2021, the second single from Hi was released. Called "Mr Haze", the track sampled the melody from "Love's Unkind" (a Giorgio Moroder production which was a Top 10 hit for Donna Summer in the late 1970s) and was performed on The One Show on BBC One. Hi is the tenth album released by Texas and includes collaborations with Richard Hawley and Altered Images' Clare Grogan, the latter duetting with Spiteri on the song "Look What You've Done".

Filmography 
Spiteri landed the part of a detective opposite Edward Furlong in the thriller 3 Blind Mice, but backed out due to pregnancy. She was also cast in Moulin Rouge! starring Nicole Kidman and Ewan McGregor, but she told Jonathan Ross on his show on 4 November 2005 that she declined because she did not want to move to Australia for a year. In 2011, she appeared in the French version of The X Factor with Henri Padovani who was managing groups for the competition. In 2016, she appeared on the British programme Top Gear, along with Seasick Steve and Tinie Tempah in a South African SUV challenge.

Personal life 
Spiteri had a long-term relationship with the editor of Arena magazine, Ashley Heath. The couple have a daughter, Misty Kyd (named after the phrase from the Clint Eastwood film Play Misty for Me and Wild West outlaw Billy the Kid), born on 9 September 2002. The birth prompted her close friend Thierry Henry to dedicate a goal to her daughter by revealing the slogan "For the new born Kyd" beneath his shirt later that day. The couple separated in 2005.

Spiteri married celebrity chef Bryn Williams in September 2018 at the 15th-century church of St. Tyrnog in Llandyrnog, North Wales. She wore a dress designed by her friend Stella McCartney. Despite being married to a chef, Spiteri does the cooking in their home, as she revealed on the Fuelling Around podcast in 2021.

At Hogmanay on 31 December 2022, she joined Dame Judi Dench in an impromptu performance of Abba's Waterloo at the Fife Arms hotel in Braemar, where they were both staying.

Political views 
In the run-up to the 2014 Scottish independence referendum, Spiteri expressed support for Scotland remaining in the Union, stating "As far as I'm concerned, I'm British. And, yeah, I'm Scottish but I feel I'm part of the UK." In September 2021, Texas announced that Spiteri and all her bandmates now supported independence after Brexit.

Other interests 
In September 2021, Spiteri appeared on BBC's RHS Chelsea Flower Show to share the garden she had created in North Wales that supplies the fruit and vegetables for her husband's restaurant.

She is a patron of children's cancer charity CLIC Sargent. She is also a supporter of Arsenal FC and a season ticket holder at the Emirates Stadium.

Spiteri is a car enthusiast.

Discography

Solo artist 

 Melody (2008)
 The Movie Songbook (2010)

with Texas 

 Southside (1989)
 Mothers Heaven (1991)
 Ricks Road (1993)
 White on Blonde (1997)
 The Hush (1999)
 Careful What You Wish For (2003)
 Red Book (2005)
 The Conversation (2013)
 Texas 25 (2015)
 Jump on Board (2017)
 Hi (2021)

References

External links 

  – official website
 Texas – official website
 
 
 Sharleen Spiteri interview by Pete Lewis, Blues & Soul magazine, October 2008
 Sharleen Spiteri interview with Diva! magazine, covering Lesbian fanbase

1967 births
Living people
Women rock singers
Scottish contraltos
Scottish people of Maltese descent
Scottish rock singers
20th-century Scottish women singers
Scottish people of Irish descent
Scottish people of Italian descent
Scottish people of German descent
Scottish pop singers
Scottish women singer-songwriters
Texas (band) members
Scottish soul singers
21st-century Scottish women singers
People from West Dunbartonshire